Ellerbeck is a small village and civil parish in the Hambleton district of North Yorkshire, England.  The population of the parish was estimated at 50 in 2010. The population as taken at the 2011 Census remained less than 100. Details are maintained in the civil parish of Winton, Stank and Hallikeld.

Ellerbeck lies on the A684 road between Northallerton  and the A19 near Osmotherley. Ellerbeck also lies on the route of one of the variations of the Coast to coast walk.

Cod Beck flows through Ellerbeck on its way down into the Vale of Mowbray from the North York Moors.

The village of Elrebec is mentioned in the Domesday Book.

There was a violent gas explosion in Ellerbeck in the late 1990s which destroyed a house in the village but did not cause any deaths.

References

External links

Villages in North Yorkshire
Civil parishes in North Yorkshire